Vasil Iliev (January 22, 1965 – April 25, 1995) was a Bulgarian mobster, businessman and wrestler.

Background
Vasil Iliev was born in 1965 in Kyustendil, Bulgaria. He was a very successful wrestler, becoming a national champion and heading the country's wrestling federation.

Criminal career 
After the end of socialism, Iliev and a number of associates moved to Hungary, where they were engaged in some low-level criminal activities such as burglaries and car theft. Eventually, he made a substantial amount of money and turned back to Bulgaria where he set up VIS (standing for Vyarnost, Investitsii, Sigurnost). The company's official business was in insurance and security, but this was really a front for criminal activity including extortion, selling stolen cars and contract killings and so on. The company was declared illegal in 1994, but its activities continued under VIS-2, yet another front for Iliev's criminal empire.

Iliev later made millions smuggling petroleum into Serbia during the UN-imposed embargo. By this time, Iliev was arguably the most powerful crime boss in the Balkans.

Death
Vasil Iliev was murdered on April 25, 1995, in Sofia. Unidentified gunmen opened fire on his Mercedes-Benz as he left his favorite restaurant, creating a fake automobile accident to seal off the road. The incident was so high profile, that the Minister of the Interior arrived at the crime scene in minutes. Iliev's bodyguards, who were traveling in a separate car unarmed, were unharmed.

The next boss of VIS was his brother Georgi Iliev. He was shot dead by a suspected sniper in Sunny Beach, Bulgaria, little more than 10 years after his brother.

See also
List of unsolved murders

References

1964 births
1995 deaths
Bulgarian male sport wrestlers
Deaths by firearm in Bulgaria
Male murder victims
Murdered Bulgarian gangsters
Murder in Sofia
People murdered in Bulgaria
20th-century Bulgarian criminals
People from Kyustendil
Unsolved murders in Bulgaria
Sportspeople from Kyustendil Province
1995 murders in Bulgaria